Darmstädter Signal is an independent organization (military watchdog group) opposing weapons of mass destruction and the primary use of military means to solve conflicts. It was founded in 1983 as a group of officers, soldiers and civil Army employees of the German Bundeswehr. According to its mission statement, the organization respects the German Army's role-defending the country within the existing legal framework, but strives to give critical feedback about the Army's mission and alternative non-military concepts of conflict resolution. The Darmstädter Signal sees the central task of the Bundeswehr in defence of freedom and democracy as basic principles of the country.

History
The organization had been founded during September 1983 in Darmstadt by 20 officers and lance sergeants. Main point of criticism in the appeal „Darmstädter Signal „with peace-political content  was the deploy  of new nuclear weapons/missiles in the middle of Europe as a consequence to the  NATO Double-Track Decision. Until today, the working group claims the removal of weapons of mass destruction and of the US nuclear weapons in Germany. Supporters of the DS founded on the 15th of March 1986 the development association of the DS. Today 130 members  belong to the working group and 200 supporters are organized in the development association. Annually, two to three workshops and public  meetings take place to define positions and to draw attention to new developments by talks and lectures.

Several  former Federal Ministers, active und  former members of the German Federal Parliament/Bundestag as well as several former Generals of the Bundeswehr are members of the  development association. Spokesmen of the development association  were Horst-Eberhard Richter, Gernot Erler und Konrad Gilges. Since autumn 2013, the retired General-Surgeon Karl Wilhelm Demmer is in this function.

Goals
On the basis of the principle of Inner Leadership (= leadership & participation & education) (Innere Führung) with its corollary of the citizen in uniform Rose, Juergen. Demokratisierung der Bundeswehr als Schritt auf dem Weg zum Frieden. (Staatsbuerger in Uniform) the "Signalers" use their fundamental right of free speech also in public and contribute to assure that the norms and values of the German Basic Law remain embedded in the Bundeswehr. The concept of Innere Führung was introduced during the early years of foundation of the new German armed forces after World War II and especially advocated by Lieutenant General Wolf Graf von Baudissin.It is a hallmark making the difference between Bundeswehr and Wehrmacht. Important goals of the Working Group are the removal of nuclear warheads and the democratization of armed forces. Darmstädter Signal does not reflect a general or official image of the mood and opinion in the German armed forces.

The 25th anniversary of the organization was celebrated in the House of History in Bonn with a laudatio by Egon Bahr. For 27 years, Helmuth Prieß had been the spokesman of the Signal.

Claims
Absolute precedence of peace keeping and peaceful solutions of conflicts over military missions.
Strict abidance of the army to constitutional principles and international law.
Empowerment of UN and OSCE
Removal of all weapons of mass destruction
National defence in alliance
Diminution of the German Army to 120.000 soldiers
No participation in peace enforcing military missions
Participation in peace-keeping Blue Beret Missions
Removal of the atomic warheads from Buechel and Ramstein
No in-country missions of the German armed forces
Stop of weapon exports
Democratization of armed forces
Open discussion of ethic questions of soldierhood

References

External links
 
https://www.uni-marburg.de/konfliktforschung/publikationen/wp14.pdf 
http://hdl.handle.net/10945/28882; Donald Abenheim: The Citizen in Uniform: Reform and its Critics in the Bundeswehr, Monterey, California, 1988-02, Calhoun, The NPS institutional Archive
http://www.weissbuch.org/den-fortgesetzten-rechtsbruch-unmissverstaendlich-beenden/ 
https://www.volkswagenstiftung.de/aktuelles-presse/aktuelles/aktdetnewsl/news/detail/artikel/die-einfache-evidenz-der-gefahr.html 

Bundeswehr
Civic and political organisations of Germany
Darmstadt